Augustin Ringeval was a French cyclist of the early 1900s. He was born in Aubigny-aux-Kaisnes in 1882.

Among other competitions, he participated in his first Tour de France in 1905. He went on to participate in many other Tours until 1913,

He died in 1967.

Major competitions
 1905 Tour de France – 6th place
 1906 Tour de France – did not finish
 1907 Tour de France – 8th place
 1908 Tour de France – did not finish
 1909 Tour de France – did not finish
 1910 Tour de France – 19th place
 1912 Tour de France – 30th place
 1913 Tour de France – did not finish

References
 :fr:Augustin Ringeval
 https://web.archive.org/web/20080726123007/http://homepage.ntlworld.com/veloarchive/races/tour/1905.htm 1905 Tour de France

1882 births
1967 deaths
Sportspeople from Aisne
French male cyclists
Cyclists from Hauts-de-France